Dimsdale is a hamlet in northern Alberta, Canada within the County of Grande Prairie No. 1.

The hamlet was named after Henry George Wadsworth Dimsdale, a construction engineer on the extension of the Edmonton, Dunvegan and British Columbia Railway.

Demographics 
Dimsdale recorded a population of 25 in the 1981 Census of Population conducted by Statistics Canada.

See also 
List of communities in Alberta
List of hamlets in Alberta

References 

County of Grande Prairie No. 1
Hamlets in Alberta